Brontiades is a genus of skippers in the family Hesperiidae.

References

Hesperiidae
Hesperiidae genera